Vysoký Chlumec is a market town in Příbram District in the Central Bohemian Region of the Czech Republic. It has about 800 inhabitants.

Administrative parts
Villages of Bláhova Lhota, Hrabří, Hradce, Jezvina, Pořešice, Vápenice and Víska are administrative parts of Vysoký Chlumec.

Geography
It lies in the Benešov Uplands.

History
The first written mention of Chlumec is from 1235. The castle was built in the second half of the 14th century and was first documented in 1382. Before the Thirty Years' War, Chlumec was referred to as a market town. In 1474, the estate was acquired by the Lobkowicz family. They owned Chlumec until the establishment of an independent municipality in 1850. In that year, the name was changed to Vysoký Chlumec to distinguish it from other places with the same name. The castle was confiscated from the Lobkowicz family by the Nazis in World War II, then again by the state in 1948.

Economy
Vysoký Chlumec is known for the Vysoký Chlumec Brewery, part of the Pivovary Lobkowicz company. The brewing tradition goes back to at least 1466.

Sights
The main landmark of Vysoký Chlumec is the Vysoký Chlumec Castle, located on a hill above the market town. The medieval castle ceased to be an aristocratic seat in the early 17th century and began to decay. After the Thirty Years' War, it was partly rebuilt. Various modifications took place continuously until the 19th century, but the castle retained its medieval character. The castle was reconstructed in the 20th century and nowadays serves as a private residence.

In Vysoký Chlumec is an open-air museum, a subsidiary of the Mining Museum in Příbram. It presents examples of rural architecture from the mid-17th century to the beginning of the 20th century, typical for the region. The exhibits in the interiors show living and farming in the village.

References

External links

Populated places in Příbram District
Market towns in the Czech Republic